Peter Gregory may refer to:

 Peter Gregory (doctor), team doctor for the England cricket team 
 Peter H. Gregory, American computer security writer
 Peter Gregory (footballer) (born 1992), English footballer
 Eric Craven Gregory (1887–1959), also known as Peter Gregory, British publisher and arts benefactor
 Peter Gregory (academic), professor at the University of Reading

 Peter Gregory (Silicon Valley), a television character